Springdale Farm(s) may refer to:

Springdale Farm (Burnham, Maine), listed on the National Register of Historic Places in Waldo County, Maine
Springdale Farm (Mendenhall, Pennsylvania), listed on the National Register of Historic Places in Southern Chester County, Pennsylvania
Springdale Farms, a historic farmers market in Cherry Hill, New Jersey